Chamara Repiyallage also known as Chamara Dharmawardana (born 10 May 1992) is a Sri Lankan judoka. He is also attached with Sri Lanka Air Force.

Career 
Chamara represented Sri Lanka at the 2014 Commonwealth Games which was his maiden appearance at the Commonwealth Games. He competed in the men's 73kg event at the 2014 Commonwealth Games and reached round of 16 before being eliminated by Jake Bensted.

He represented Sri Lanka at the 2016 Summer Olympics which also marked his debut Olympic appearance and competed in the men's 73 kg event, in which he was eliminated in the third round by Lasha Shavdatuashvili. He clinched a silver medal in the 73kg event at the 2016 South Asian Games.

He also competed in the men's 73kg event at the 2017 World Judo Championships and also competed in the men's 73kg event at the 2019 World Judo Championships He made his Asian Games debut during the 2018 Asian Games and competed in the men's 73kg event. He secured a gold medal in the 73kg category at the 2019 South Asian Games.

Chamara has qualified for the 2020 Summer Olympics through an invitation from the Tripartite Commission, and will be Sri Lanka's flag bearer at the Parade of Nations alongside gymnast Milka Gehani.

References

External links
 

1992 births
Living people
People from Central Province, Sri Lanka
Sri Lankan male judoka
Olympic judoka of Sri Lanka
Judoka at the 2016 Summer Olympics
Judoka at the 2014 Commonwealth Games
Judoka at the 2018 Asian Games
Asian Games competitors for Sri Lanka
Commonwealth Games competitors for Sri Lanka
Judoka at the 2020 Summer Olympics
South Asian Games medalists in judo
South Asian Games gold medalists for Sri Lanka
South Asian Games silver medalists for Sri Lanka
20th-century Sri Lankan people
21st-century Sri Lankan people